Re Conegrade Ltd or Saxton v Clarke [2002] EWHC 2411 (Ch) is a UK insolvency law case, concerning voidable transactions.

Facts
Conegrade Ltd was a small engineering company. It had four directors, two of which were Mr and Mrs Clarke. Conegrade Ltd had a loan account, which included debts for loans by directors to the company. All board members attended a vote, and voted in favour, of selling a freehold property in Station Road, Uppingham, worth £125,000 to Mr and Mrs Clarke. These two directors would then lease the property back to the company, but they paid only £64,808, which was the balance in the loan account. This settled a debt owed by the company to the Clarkes. Conegrade Ltd was insolvent within a year or so. The liquidators argued the transaction was a preference under IA 1986 section 239.

Judgment
Lloyd J held that the only compelling reason for the transfer was the rightly presumed desire to place Mr and Mrs Clarke in a better position, above the creditors.

See also

UK insolvency law

Notes

References

United Kingdom insolvency case law
Court of Appeal (England and Wales) cases
2002 in British law
2002 in case law